Mark Royal (born 1975) is an English international lawn and indoor bowler.

Bowls career

Outdoors
Royal won the Men's Champion of Champions singles title in 2003, at the National Championships. In 2021, he reached the final of the event again, only to lose out to Jamie Chestney 21–11.

Indoors
Indoors he reached a career high world indoor ranking of 2 in 2009 and has been in the worlds top 16 since 2003.

Major successes include winning the Welsh Open in 2008 and 2011.

Awards
He was awarded the 2009 Players Player of the Year and Performance of the Year by the World Bowls Tour.

Personal life
By trade he works with Potters Leisure Resort and its manager Greg Harlow in regard to their bowls organisation. He is married with three children.

References

1975 births
Living people
English male bowls players